Anthony Bryant (born November 6, 1981) is a former American football defensive tackle.

Professional career

Projected as a mid-seventh round pick, Bryant was drafted by the Tampa Bay Buccaneers in the sixth round of the 2005 NFL Draft. He played college football at Alabama.

Bryant has also been a member of the Detroit Lions, Atlanta Falcons, Baltimore Ravens, Miami Dolphins, New York Giants, and Washington Redskins.

References

External links
New York Giants bio
Tampa Bay Buccaneers bio
Washington Redskins bio

1981 births
Living people
People from Greensboro, Alabama
Players of American football from Alabama
American football defensive tackles
Alabama Crimson Tide football players
Tampa Bay Buccaneers players
Detroit Lions players
Atlanta Falcons players
Baltimore Ravens players
Miami Dolphins players
New York Giants players
Washington Redskins players